Karama may refer to:

Geography
 Al Karama, Dubai, UAE
 Al Karama, Syria (disambiguation)
 Electoral division of Karama, an electoral division in Australia
 Karama, Northern Territory, a suburb of Darwin, Australia
 Karama River, a river in Sulawesi, Indonesia
 Karama site, an Early Paleolithic paleoanthropological site in the Anuy River valley, Russia
 Karama, Nyagatare District, a sector in Nyagatare District, Rwanda
 Karama, Huye District, a sector in the South West of Huye District, Southern Province, Rwanda

Other uses
 Karama, an Arab world women's rights organisation founded in 2005 by Hibaaq Osman
 Karamat, miracles performed by Muslim saints

See also
 Karamah (disambiguation)
 Karameh (disambiguation)